B-Bop's, Inc. is a double drive-thru 1950s themed casual fast food restaurant chain, with franchise locations in central Iowa.

History
B-Bop's was created by Bob Johnson in 1988. The first B-Bop's was located at 1500 East Euclid, Des Moines, Iowa, as Johnson saw it as the ideal location to build a double drive-thru. That location has now been demolished after Bob Johnson built a new B-Bops around the corner on East 14th St.

Today, there are twelve B-Bop's locations in Iowa, ten of which are in the Des Moines area along with two in Ames. A location in Cedar Rapids on Edgewood Road was removed in the early 2000s.

Awards
B-Bop's has won Cityview's Best of Des Moines award in the category of Best Burger for twenty six years in a row.  B-Bop's was also a runner-up for Best French Fry for Cityview's Best of Des Moines awards for the past five years and 2016 runner up for best hangover food.

References

External links
Official site

Fast-food franchises
1988 establishments in Iowa